Bill Graham or Billy Graham may refer to:

Arts and entertainment
 Billy Graham (comics) (1935–1997), American comic book artist
 Bill Graham (director) (1926–2013), American television and film director
 Bill Graham (musician) (1918–1975), American jazz saxophonist
 Bill Graham (promoter) (1931–1991), American music promoter
 Bill Graham, character in Ann Carver's Profession

Sports
 Bill Graham (baseball) (1937–2006), American baseball player
 Billy Graham (American boxer) (1922–1992), American boxer
 Billy Graham (New Zealand boxer) (born 1947/1948), winner of four New Zealand titles at light welterweight
 Bill Graham (Canadian football) (1935–2020), Canadian football player for the Hamilton Tiger-Cats
 Superstar Billy Graham (born 1943), American former professional wrestler
 Billy Graham (born 1955), trainer of boxer Ricky Hatton
 Billy Graham (footballer) (1914–1996), English footballer

Others
 Billy Graham (1918–2018), American evangelist
 Bill Graham (Australian politician) (1919–1995), Australian politician
 Bill Graham (author) (1951–1996), Irish rock journalist and author
 Bill Graham (Canadian politician) (1939–2022), Canadian politician, former foreign minister, former Leader of the Opposition and former interim leader of the Liberal Party of Canada

See also
 Billy Gram (born 1970), American musician and professional wrestling manager
 William Graham (disambiguation)